Chadron may refer to:
 Chadron, Nebraska, United States
 Chadron, Haute-Loire, France
 Chadron State College, a college in Chadron, Nebraska
 Hotel Chadron, a hotel in Chadron, Nebraska
 Chadron Moore, also known by his stage name Nitti Beatz, American record producer